The 2019 World Junior Ice Hockey Championship Division II consisted of two tiered groups of six teams each: the fourth-tier Division II A and the fifth-tier Division II B. For each tier, the team which places first promoted to the next highest division, while the team which places last relegated to a lower division.

The tournaments are a round-robin tournament format, with two points allotted for a win, one additional point for a regulation win, and one point for an overtime or game winning shots loss.

To be eligible as a junior, a player couldn't be born earlier than 1999.

Division II A was held in Tallinn, Estonia, while Division II B was hosted in Zagreb, Croatia.

Division II A
The Division II A tournament was played in Tallinn, Estonia, from 13 to 19 January 2019.

Participants

Final standings

All times are local. (UTC+2)''

Statistics

Top 10 scorers

GP = Games played; G = Goals; A = Assists; Pts = Points; +/− = Plus-minus; PIM = Penalties In Minutes
Source: IIHF

Goaltending leaders
(minimum 40% team's total ice time)

TOI = Time On Ice (minutes:seconds); GA = Goals against; GAA = Goals against average; Sv% = Save percentage; SO = Shutouts
Source: IIHF

Awards

Best Players Selected by the Directorate
 Goaltender:  Lubys Laurynas
 Defenceman:  Saveli Novikov
 Forward:  Liam Kirk

Division II B
The Division II B tournament was played in Zagreb, Croatia, from 15 to 21 January 2019.

Participants

Standings

All times are local. (UTC+1)

External links
IIHF.com

II
World Junior Ice Hockey Championships – Division II
International ice hockey competitions hosted by Croatia
International ice hockey competitions hosted by Estonia
2019 in Croatian sport
2019 in Estonian sport
Sports competitions in Zagreb
Sports competitions in Tallinn
IIHF